Robin Witt is an American theater director. She is an ensemble member at both the Griffin Theatre and Steep Theatre Company in Chicago. Witt's notable productions include Enda Walsh's The New Electric Ballroom at A Red Orchid Theatre, Dennis Kelly's Love and Money, Simon Stephens' Wastwater, Motortown, Pornography, and Harper Regan at Steep Theatre, as well as Ena Lamont Stewart's Men Should Weep (2014-15 Jeff Award: Director, Production), Terence Rattigan's Flare Path (2013 Jeff Nominations, Director and Production) and Edna Ferber and George Kaufman's Stage Door (2011 Jeff Nominations, Director and Production) with the Griffin Theatre. 

A graduate of NYU's Tisch School of the Arts (BFA) and Northwestern University (MFA), Witt is currently an Associate Professor of Directing at the University of North Carolina Charlotte.

Witt is the daughter of American television and theater actor Howard Witt and the great-niece of Sarah Schectman Zelzer, author of "Impresario: The Zelzer Era, 1930-1990." She is from Chicago, Illinois.

References

External links 
 ‘Men Should Weep’ at Griffin Theatre explores dynamic between poverty and family
 Dark and disturbing days, set in Britain's motor city REVIEW: "Motortown" at Steep Theatre ★★★½
 Juliet: A Dialogue About Love, Edinburgh Fringe Festival, 2013
 "Pornography" review, Time Out Chicago
 Family Rituals: Three sisters, one preoccupation in Enda Walsh's play
 Harper Regan
 Jones, Chris. "'Harper Regan' at Steep Theatre: A four-star telling of the truth about middle age." Chicago Tribune
 Time Out Chicago: Ten Most Wanted
 Not a Game for Boys
 Abundance
 Fascists in Love
 Bug (play)

American theatre directors
Women theatre directors
Living people
Year of birth missing (living people)
Tisch School of the Arts alumni
Northwestern University alumni
University of North Carolina at Charlotte faculty